Sulimierz may refer to the following places in Poland:
Sulimierz, Lower Silesian Voivodeship (south-west Poland)
Sulimierz, West Pomeranian Voivodeship (north-west Poland)